Ukraine is home to four nuclear power plants, as well as the Chernobyl Exclusion Zone, site of the 1986 Chernobyl disaster. As of 11 March, both Chernobyl and the Zaporizhzhia Nuclear Power Plant had seen battles during the 2022 Russian invasion of Ukraine. The invasion has prompted significant discussion about the status of the power plants, including fears of potential disasters, and has also prompted debates about nuclear energy programmes in other European countries.

Battles 
The Battle of Chernobyl took place on 24 February, the first day of the invasion, as part of the Kyiv offensive. Russian forces captured the exclusion zone the same day.

The Siege of Enerhodar began on 28 February, as Russian forces advanced during the Southern Ukraine offensive. The Russian assault on the Zaporizhzhia Nuclear Power Plant began on 3 March, capturing the power plant by the next day. On 6 March, the IAEA released a statement expressing concern over potential Russian military interference in the operations of the power plant and over cuts to mobile and internet networks that the plant used for communications.

Safety concerns 
Since the occupation of Chernobyl and the Zaporizhzhia power plant, a number of safety concerns have been raised by the IAEA and the Ukrainian government, including over failure to give staff proper rest and lack of regular maintenance work being carried out. Pharmacies in several European countries reported selling out of iodine pills in the first two weeks following the invasion.  However, several European nuclear safety authorities have to date concluded that there is no immediate danger of a significant radioactive disaster occurring.

On 6 March, French President Emmanuel Macron held a call with Russian President Vladimir Putin in which he urged Putin to "ensure the safety of these plants and that they are excluded from the conflict." Following the call, the Kremlin released a statement saying that it was willing to engage in negotiations with the IAEA and the Ukrainian government over ensuring that safety.

Debates over nuclear power in Europe 
The invasion of Ukraine has prompted increased discussion about the future of nuclear power in Europe, with a number of commentators arguing in favour of increasing nuclear power generation in order to decrease dependence on natural gas imported from Russia.

Germany in particular has seen debates over nuclear power phase-out, which has overseen the shutdown of most of the nuclear power plants in the country since 2011, with the remaining three also due to be shut down. On 28 February, the German economics minister stated that the German government would consider suspending the phase-out of remaining nuclear power plants in the country. However, on 9 March, Germany released a statement rejecting calls to suspend the phase-out of nuclear power. Belgium has also seen debates about extending the life span of its existing nuclear reactors.

George Monbiot wrote in The Guardian that Europe "collectively receives 41% of its gas imports and 27% of its oil imports from Russia," arguing that Europe "reduced ourselves to craven dependency on that despotic government, through a dismal failure to wean ourselves off fossil fuels."

Some commentators have also raised issues of Russian exports of nuclear energy technology. In Finland, the Hanhikivi Nuclear Power Plant project was cancelled due to the invasion. Hartmut Winkler of the University of Johannesburg has stated that Russian state nuclear energy corporation Rosatom faced significant loss of international business due to the invasion, stating that the "era of Russian foreign nuclear builds is therefore soon likely to be over."

See also 
 Zaporizhzhia Nuclear Power Plant crisis
 Nuclear power in Ukraine

References 

Nuclear power plants and the 2022 Russian invasion of Ukraine
Impacts of the 2022 Russian invasion of Ukraine
Nuclear power in Ukraine
Chernobyl Exclusion Zone
Energoatom